Dick Thomas (birth unknown – death unknown) was a Welsh professional rugby league footballer who played in the 1900s. He played at representative level for Welsh League XIII, and at club level for Oldham RLFC (Heritage № 43) and Aberdare RLFC, as a forward (prior to the specialist positions of), during the era of contested scrums.

International honours
Dick Thomas played as a forward, i.e. number 13, for Welsh League XIII in the 14-13 victory over Australia at Penydarren Park, Merthyr Tydfil on Tuesday 19 January 1909.

References

External links

Aberdare RLFC players
Oldham R.L.F.C. players
Place of birth missing
Place of death missing
Rugby league forwards
Welsh League rugby league team players
Welsh rugby league players
Year of birth missing
Year of death missing